The United Nurses of Alberta (UNA) is a trade union representing more than 30,000 Registered Nurses, Registered Psychiatric Nurses, and allied health workers in Alberta, Canada. UNA negotiates collective bargaining with the employers, of which the largest are Alberta Health Services and Covenant Health.

UNA advocates for public healthcare, safe staffing levels, occupational health and safety and membership participation. UNA has been a strong advocate for strengthening Alberta's public healthcare system and has advocated for the hiring of more professional nursing staff. UNA provides numerous educational and professional development opportunities for its members.

UNA was formed on May 6, 1977, when the Alberta Association of Registered Nurses (now the College and Association of Registered Nurses of Alberta) general membership voted to make its collective bargaining committee an independent organization. In 1997, UNA and the Staff Nurses' Association of Alberta amalgamated, forming one union for Registered Nurses in the province.

UNA members voted to affiliate with the Canadian Federation of Nurses Unions (CFNU) in 1998 and join the Alberta Federation of Labour in 2001.

See also
List of nursing organizations
Nursing in Canada
 Alberta Union of Provincial Employees
 Alberta Federation of Labour
 Canadian Federation of Nurses Unions
 Health Sciences Association of Alberta

References

External links
 

Medical and health organizations based in Alberta
Healthcare trade unions in Canada
Nursing organizations in Canada
Public sector trade unions
Trade unions in Alberta